Coralliozetus cardonae, the twinhorn blenny, is a species of chaenopsid blenny found in coral reefs in the western Atlantic ocean. It can reach a maximum length of  TL.

References
 Evermann, B. W. and M. C. Marsh  1899 (19 Dec.) Descriptions of new genera and species of fishes from Puerto Rico. Report of the United States Fish Commission v. 25 [1899]: 351–362.

Coralliozetus
Fish of the Caribbean
Fish described in 1899